Backspot is an upcoming film directed by D.W. Waterson in their feature length directorial debut. It is executive produced by Elliot Page via Page Boy Productions, and stars Kudakwashe Rutendo, Evan Rachel Wood, and Devery Jacobs, who also acts as producer, along with Waterston, through their Night is Y production company.

Synopsis 
Two cheerleaders, Riley (Jacobs) and Amanda (Rutendo). Both are impressive members of their mid-level cheerleading squad until a professional coach (Wood) gives them a chance to with elite cheer squad The Thunderhawks.

Cast
Devery Jacobs as Riley 
Kudakwashe Rutendo as Amanda
Evan Rachel Wood as Eileen McNamara
Thomas Antony Olajide
Olunike Adeliyi
Wendy Crewson
Shannyn Sossamon

Production
The project is produced Page Boy Productions, Night is Y and Prospero Pictures. It was written by Joanne Sarazen, based on a story by Waterson. Elliot Page, Matthew Jordan Smith, John Davidson, and Katisha Shaw executive produce, with Alona Metzer, Waterson, Devery Jacobs and Martin Katz as producers. In cheerleading a backspotter acts as a support to the flyer during cheerleading stunts which is referenced in the title of the project.

Casting
As well as producing the movie, Devery Jacobs was announced as one of the lead cast in October 2022. Newcomer Kudakwashe Rutendo was announced as part of the cast in February 2023. Evan Rachel Wood was revealed to have joined the production in March 2023.

Filming
Principal photography began in Toronto in February 2023. It was reported by Collider that filming had wrapped in March 2023.

References

External links

Upcoming films
2020s English-language films
Upcoming English-language films
Films shot in Toronto
Films shot in Canada
Cheerleading films
LGBT-related drama films
Upcoming directorial debut films